Adesmus collaris is a species of beetle in the family Cerambycidae. It was described by Melzer in 1931. It is known from Brazil.

References

Adesmus
Beetles described in 1931